Joseph P. Remington (March 26, 1847 – January 1, 1918) was a community pharmacist, manufacturer, and educator. An active participant and a supporter of the International Pharmaceutical Congress, Remington served as president of the 7th Congress in Chicago in 1893.

Awards 
The Remington Medal was established in 1918 and awarded by the American Pharmacists Association. The award is considered the most prestigious award given in the profession of pharmacy in the United States.

See also
 List of pharmacists

References

American pharmacists
Businesspeople from Philadelphia
1847 births
1918 deaths
19th-century American businesspeople